Waqar Anwar (born 26 August 1989) is a Pakistani cricketer. He made his first-class debut for Karachi Blues in the 2013–14 Quaid-e-Azam Trophy on 23 October 2013.

References

External links
 

1989 births
Living people
Pakistani cricketers
Karachi Blues cricketers
People from Gujranwala